The Edwards family of Chile is of Welsh origin. They became financially and politically influential during the 19th century. They have played and still play a significant role in Chilean politics, especially as owners of its most influential newspaper chain, El Mercurio S.A.P.

Prominent members

George Edwards Brown (1780–1848), British doctor and businessman, founder of the family in Chile
Agustín Edwards Ossandón (1815–1878), Chilean businessman
Juana Ross Edwards (1830–1913), Chilean philanthropist
Agustín Edwards Ross (1852–1897), businessman and politician, purchased the Valparaíso, Chile edition of El Mercurio newspaper in 1880
Alberto Edwards Vives (1874–1932), politician, historian and lawyer
Agustín Edwards Mac-Clure (1878–1941), businessman, diplomat and politician, President of the League of Nations and founder of the Santiago edition of El Mercurio newspaper
Raúl Edwards Mac-Clure (1880–1927), businessman and politician
Joaquín Edwards Bello (1887–1968), writer and journalist
María Edwards Mac-Clure (1893–1972), Righteous Among the Nations
Agustín Edwards Budge (1899–1956), businessman
Agustín Edwards Eastman (1927–2017), politician, business man and Chilean newspaper publisher
Jorge Edwards Valdés (1931–2023) novelist, winner of the 1999 Cervantes Prize
Cristián Edwards del Río, businessman and kidnapping victim
Sebastián Edwards (born 1953), economist, professor, speaker, author, and consultant

See also
El Mercurio
History of Chile
Edwards (surname)

References

 
Chilean families
Chilean people of Welsh descent
Chilean people of English descent
Chilean people of Scottish descent
Newspaper publishers (people)